Sheikh Jamal-ud-Din Ahmad was a direct descendant of Imam Abu Hanifa, the renowned Sunni-Persian jurist of Islam. He was born at Ghazni, (Khorasan) which is in Modern-day Afghanistan, in 583 A.H. (c. 1187). He was five years old when his family came to Hansi. He became a disciple of Baba Fariduddin Ganjshakar at the age of 50. He learnt deeply and served devotedly.

Early life 
He was a scholar and a poet. Before becoming a Sufi, Shaikh Jamal-ud-Din had been the khatib of Hansi, owning villages and extensive property. Discipleship with Baba Farid meant abandoning material prosperity. When his poverty became overwhelming, Shaikh Jamal-ud-Din, using Shaikh Nizam-ud-din Auliya of Delhi as a go-between, informed Baba Sahib of his extreme impecuniosity. Through the Shaikh the Baba replied that it was Shaikh Jamal-ud-Din's duty to bear the spiritual burden assigned to him.

Life In Hansi 
He was a scholar and a poet. Before becoming a Sufi, Shaikh Jamal-ud-Din had been the khatib of Hansi, owning villages and extensive property. Discipleship with Baba Farid meant abandoning material prosperity. When his poverty became overwhelming, Shaikh Jamal-ud-Din, using Shaikh Nizam-ud-Din Auliya of Delhi as a go-between, informed Baba Sahib of his extreme impecuniosity. Through the Shaikh the Baba replied that it was Shaikh Jamal-ud-Din's duty to bear the spiritual burden assigned to him.

It is said that once Shiekh Baha-ud-din Zakariya of Multan came to Baba Farid and stayed with him for some time. On his return, he wrote to Baba Sahib “Give me your disciple Jamal and have all mine and courtesy demands that request be no turned down.” Baba Farid is reported to have replied: “Exchange is permissible in goods material. But Jamal (which means beauty) is not exchangeable.”

Baba Farid liked Sheikh Jamal-ud-din so much that he went to Hansi to stay with Sheikh Jamal-ud-din for 12 years. He nominated him as his Khalifa.

He trusted him so much that whenever Baba Farid would give the letter of Khilafat to anyone, he would direct him have it countersigned by Shaikh Jamal-ud-Din of Hansi.
Shaikh Jamal-ud-Din performed this duty most conscientiously. Once Shaikh Jamal refused to endorse the kahilafat-nama which the Baba had granted a disciple, under some pressure. Shaikh Jamal was so angry that he tore the paper containing the Khilafat-nama to pieces, while informing the disciple that he was unworthy of such an honour. Baba Farid supported Shaikh Jamal-ud-Din
actions telling the disciple he was unable to mend what Jamal had rent apart.

Death 
Jamal-ud-Din died during Baba Farid-ud-din’s lifetime. He died at Hansi (Haryana-India) on 12th of Shaban 659 A.H. at the age of 76 years.

He left behind Mulhimaat in Arabic – a prose work consisting of Sufi aphorisms and his Diwan of poetry in two volumes. His other two works namely Pandnama Farsi and Umdatur-Waizeen are not available. Mulhimaat’s translated version accompanying.

A lady took a minor son of Qutb Jamal to Baba Sahib. He treated him most kindly and appointed him a Khalifa. She said to a Baba Sahib : Khawaja Burhan-ud-din is a child. To which Baba Sahib said: The moon too begins as a crescent and gradually becomes full moon.

Tomb 
He lies buried in a mausoleum at Hansi.

In the wake of partition of the Punjab in August 1947, Hansi witnessed a great massacre. With the exodus of the entire Muslim population from Hansi, the Mazar remained neglected for sometime. It was in 1961 that Shah Waliur Rehman Jamal (d. 1961) restarted observance of Qutb Jamal’s urs at the Dargah Sharif in Hansi, which is continuing. Thousands of devotees from all over the subcontinent gather together annually to pay their devout homage there.

References 

Inspired sayings of Hazrat Qutb Jamaluddin Ahmad Hansvi, Translated by: Sardar Ali Ahmad Khan
Dargah Char Qutub
Char Qutab

Iranian Sufis
Persian-language poets
Sufi mystics
Mystic poets
Chishtis
1180s births
1260s deaths
Iranian emigrants to India
People from Hisar district